The Rio Tapajós saki or Gray's bald-faced saki (Pithecia irrorata) is a species of saki monkey, a type of New World monkey, from South America. It is found in parts of western Brazil, southeastern Colombia, southeastern Peru and possibly northern Bolivia.

References 

Rio Tapajós saki
Mammals of Bolivia
Mammals of Brazil
Mammals of Peru
Rio Tapajós saki
Rio Tapajós saki